Lamidorcadion annulipes is a species of beetle in the family Cerambycidae. It was described by Maurice Pic in 1934.

References

Morimopsini
Beetles described in 1934